Jeremias Lorch (born 2 December 1995) is a German professional footballer who plays as a midfielder for FC Viktoria Köln.

References

External links
 

Living people
1995 births
Sportspeople from Heilbronn
German footballers
Association football midfielders
SG Sonnenhof Großaspach players
SV Wehen Wiesbaden players
FC Viktoria Köln players
2. Bundesliga players
3. Liga players
Footballers from Baden-Württemberg